Open coding in grounded theory method is the analytic process by which concepts (codes) to the observed data and phenomenon are attached during qualitative data analysis. It is one of the 'procedures' for working with text as characterized by Strauss (1987) and Strauss and Corbin (1990). Open coding aims at developing substantial codes describing, naming or classifying the phenomenon under consideration. Open coding is achieved by segmenting data into meaningful expressions and describing them in single word to short sequence of words. Further, relevant annotations and concepts are then attached to these expressions.

Open coding may be applied in varying degrees of detail. The codes can be linked to a line, a sentence, a paragraph or wholesome text (protocol, case, etc.). The application of the alternatives depends on the research question, on the relevant data, personal style of analyst and the stage of research. However, while coding, the main aim of coding should be in sight i.e. to break down and understand the text and develop categories to be put in order in the course of time.

The result of open coding should be a list characterising codes and categories attached to the text and supported by code notes that were produced to explain the content of codes. These notes could be striking observations and thoughts that are relevant to the development of theory.

Although codes are exclusive to the research material and the style of the analyst, it is suggested researchers should address the text with the following questions:
 What? – Identify the underlying issue and the phenomenon
 Who? – Identify the actors involved and the roles they play.
 How? – Identifying the aspects of phenomenon
 When? How long? Where? – Time, course and location
 How much? How long? – Identifying the intensity 
 Why? – Identifying the reasons attached to the phenomenon
 What for? – Identifying intention or purpose
 By which? – Strategies and tactics to achieve the goal

See also 
 Grounded theory
 Axial coding
 Selective Coding

References 

Data analysis
Qualitative research